Heflin's Store, also known as Stover's Store and Brawner's Store, is a historic general store located near Little Georgetown, Fauquier County, Virginia.  It was built in 1845, and is a -story, three bay, stuccoed rubble stone structure.  It has a front gable roof.  The building housed a general store from the time of its construction into the 1970s.

It was listed on the National Register of Historic Places in 2004.

See also
National Register of Historic Places listings in Fauquier County, Virginia

References

External links

Commercial buildings on the National Register of Historic Places in Virginia
Commercial buildings completed in 1845
Buildings and structures in Fauquier County, Virginia
National Register of Historic Places in Fauquier County, Virginia
Historic district contributing properties in Virginia